Field & Stream: Trophy Bass 3D, also known as simply Trophy Bass 3D, is a fishing video game developed by Dynamix and published by Sierra Sports for Microsoft Windows in 1999. It is the third game in the Trophy Bass series.

Reception

The game received above-average reviews according to the review aggregation website GameRankings.

References

External links
 

1999 video games
Fishing video games
Sierra Entertainment games
Video game sequels
Windows games
Windows-only games
Dynamix games
Single-player video games
Video games developed in the United States